Tiran Vazgeni Khachatryan (born 1977) is an Armenian lieutenant general who formerly served as the First Deputy Chief of the General Staff of the Armed Forces of Armenia. During the 2020 Nagorno-Karabakh war, Khachatryan was conferred with the title of National Hero of Armenia.

Life and career 
Tiran Vazgenovich Khachatryan was born on 20 July 1977 in the Armenian SSR, part of the then Soviet Union.

In 1987, he joined the Proshyan Volunteer Detachment to take part in operations along the border villages of the Noyemberyan District in Armenia. During the First Nagorno-Karabakh War, from 1990 to 1991, he was a military signalman in the Armenian Armed Forces and provided communications with the border regions of the country, the breakaway Nagorno-Karabakh Republic and Yerevan. From 1991 to 1994, he fought in the ARF's Shushi Battalion.

On 4 September 2013, by the decree of the President of Armenia, he was appointed head of the Combat Training Department of the Armenian Armed Forces with the conclusion of a five-year contract.

On 15 June 2020, by the decree of the President of Armenia, he was appointed the First Deputy Chief of the General Staff of the Armenian Armed Forces. On February 24, 2021, Khachatryan was relieved of the post of First Deputy Chief of the General Staff of the Armed Forces. Khachatryan's dismissal on the order of Prime Minister Nikol Pashinyan was the stated reason for a declaration by more than 40 of Armenia's top military officers (including Khachatryan) calling for Pashinyan's resignation; Pashinyan condemned the declaration as a coup attempt.

References 

Armenian generals
Armenian military personnel of the Nagorno-Karabakh War
Armenian military personnel of the 2020 Nagorno-Karabakh war
Living people
1977 births